The National Artist Pablo Antonio's postwar oeuvre, the Capitan Luis Gonzaga Building, built in 1953 at the corner of Carriedo Street and Rizal Avenue in Manila, Philippines, transfigured the modernist box into a building that was suited to the tropics by utilizing double sunshades. The concrete slab overhangs at both ceiling height and window sill height for every floor braced by staggered vertical fins of half-storey height. Curved bands of concrete horizontally traversed every floor. It serves as a protection for both sunlight and rain.

References

External links 

Buildings and structures in Santa Cruz, Manila
Buildings and structures completed in 1953
1953 establishments in the Philippines
Works of National Artists of the Philippines
Modernist architecture in the Philippines